The 2017 season was the 105th season of competitive soccer in the United States.

National teams

Men's

Senior

Results and fixtures

Friendlies

World Cup qualifying

Fifth round

CONCACAF Gold Cup

Group B

Goalscorers
Goals are current as of November 14, 2017, after match against .

Managerial changes
This is a list of changes of managers:

U-23

U-20

CONCACAF Under-20 Championship

Group stage

Classification stage

2017 FIFA U-20 World Cup

Group F

U-19

Friendlies

U-18

2017 Slovakia Cup

2017 U-18 Lisbon International Tournament

U-17

Friendlies

CONCACAF U-17 Championship

Group stage

Classification stage

2017 FIFA U-17 World Cup

Group A

Ranking of third-placed teams

Matches

U-16

Montaigu Tournament

Group phase

Classification stage

U-15

2017 Torneo Delle Nazioni

U.S. Beach National Team

2017 CONCACAF Beach Soccer Championship

Group stage

Knockout stage

Women's

Senior

Results and fixtures

Friendlies

She Believes Cup

2017 Tournament of Nations

Goalscorers

Goals are current as of November 12, 2017 after match against .

U-23

Nordic Four-Nations Tournament

Friendlies

La Manga Tournament

2017 Thorns Spring Invitational

U-20

Friendlies

La Manga Tournament

U-19

Friendlies

U-18

Friendlies

U-17

2017 Torneo Femminile Delle Nazioni

CFA International Women's Youth Tournament 2017 Weifang

U-16

Women's U-16 Development Tournament

U-15

Club competitions

Men's

League Competitions

Major League Soccer

Conference tables 

 Eastern Conference

 Western Conference

2017 table
Note: the table below has no impact on playoff qualification and is used solely for determining host of the MLS Cup, certain CCL spots, the Supporters' Shield trophy, seeding in the 2018 Canadian Championship, and 2018 MLS draft. The conference tables are the sole determinant for teams qualifying for the playoffs.

Aggregate 2017 and 2018 table

MLS Playoffs

MLS Cup 2017

North American Soccer League

Spring Season

Fall Season

USL 

Eastern Conference

Western Conference

Cup Competitions

US Open Cup

Final

International competitions

CONCACAF Competitions

2016–17 CONCACAF Champions League

2016–17 CONCACAF Knockout Stage

2016–17 CONCACAF Quarterfinals

|}

2016–17 CONCACAF Semifinals

|}

Women's

League Competitions

National Women's Soccer League

Overall table

NWSL Playoffs

Women's Premier Soccer League

United Women's Soccer

Cup Competitions

USASA National Women's Open Cup

Honors

Professional

Amateur

References

External links
US Soccer Schedule
US Soccer Results
CONCACAF

 
Seasons in American soccer